Edward Theodore Knecht (October 12, 1927 – June 8, 2018) was an American football coach and collegiate athletic director. He was the head coach at the College of Idaho in Caldwell from 1976 to 1976. Prior to the C of I, Knecht was the athletic director at the University of Idaho in Moscow from 1969 to 1973.

References

External links
University of Idaho Athletics Hall of Fame
1959 Idaho Vandals football coaching staff

1927 births
2018 deaths
College of Idaho Coyotes football coaches
Idaho Vandals athletic directors
Idaho Vandals football coaches
Oregon State Beavers football coaches
Toledo Rockets football players
High school football coaches in Idaho
Sportspeople from Toledo, Ohio
Players of American football from Ohio